In organic chemistry, a cyclitol is a cycloalkane containing at least three hydroxyl, each attached to a different ring carbon atom.

The name is also used for compounds that can be viewed as result of substituting various functional groups for the hydrogen atoms in such a molecule, as well as similar molecules with one or more double bonds in the ring.

Cyclitols and their derivatives are some of the compatible solutes which are formed in a plant as a response to salt or water stress. Some cyclitols (e.g. quinic or shikimic acid) are parts of hydrolysable tannins.

Isomerism and nomenclature
Unsubstituted cyclitols with the same ring size and number of hydroxyls may exist in several structural isomers, depending on the position of the hydroxyls along the ring.  For example, cyclohexanetriol exists in three distinct isomers (1,2,3-, 1,2,4-, and 1,3,5-).

Furthermore, the hydrogen and the hydroxyl on each carbon atom may lie in two possible arrangements relative to the local ring plane; so that each structural isomer may exist in several stereoisomers, depending on which side of the ring plane the hydroxyls are.  For example, there are nine stereoisomers of 1,2,3,4,5,6-cyclohexanehexol (inositol), and two of them are enantiomers. The IUPAC has provided a nomenclature for cyclitol stereoisomers.

Naturally occurring cyclitols

Unsubstituted
 Conduritol, or cyclohex-5-ene-1,2,3,4-tetrol; two out of ten possible isomers.
 Inositol, or cyclohexane-1,2,3,4,5,6-hexol; four out of nine possible isomers.
 Cyclohexanetetrol

Substituted
 Bornesitol; (1R,2R,3S,4S,5R,6S)-6-methoxycyclohexane-1,2,3,4,5-pentol; D-(−)-O-methyl-myo-inositol
 Pinitol; (1S,2S,4S,5R)-6-methoxycyclohexane-1,2,3,4,5-pentol; 3-O-methyl-D-chiro-inositol
 Ononitol; (1R,2S,3S,4S,5S,6S)-6-methoxycyclohexane-1,2,3,4,5-pentaol; 4-O-methyl-myo-inositol
 Pinpollitol; (1R,2R,3R,4S,5R,6S)-3,6-dimethoxycyclohexane-1,2,4,5-tetraol; di-O-methyl-(+)-chiro-inositol
 Quebrachitol; (1R,2S,4S,5R)-6-methoxycyclohexane-1,2,3,4,5-pentol; 2-0-methyl-chiro-inositol
 Quinic acid; (1S,3R,4S,5R)-1,3,4,5-tetrahydroxycyclohexanecarboxylic acid
 Shikimic acid; (3R,4S,5R)-3,4,5-trihydroxycyclohex-1-ene-1-carboxylic acid
 Valienol; (1S,2S,3S,4R)-5-(Hydroxymethyl)cyclohex-5-ene-1,2,3,4-tetrol
 Viscumitol (1R,2S,3R,4S,5R,6S)-5,6-dimethoxycyclohexane-1,2,3,4-tetraol; 1,2-di-O-methyl-muco-inositol

Glycosides
 Ciceritol, a pinitol digalactoside

Phosphates
 Phytic acid; (1R,2S,3r,4R,5S,6s)-cyclohexane-1,2,3,4,5,6-hexayl hexakis[dihydrogen(phosphate)]; inositol hexakisphosphate

Other cyclitols
 1,2,3,4-Cyclohexanetetrol
 1,2,3,4,5-Cyclopentanepentol

Analysis methods
In 1955, Posternak and others described the separation of cyclitols by paper chromatography in various solvents, and three methods of development: Tollens reagents, the Meillère reagent (based on the Scherer-Gallois reaction), and digestion by Acetobacter suboxydans followed by Tollens reagent.

See also
 Aminocyclitol

References

External links

 List of cyclitol molecules on chemicalland21.com